The Price Creek Lighthouse, also known as the Price's Creek Lighthouse, is a structure located near Southport, North Carolina. It was one of two range lights at Price Creek in a series of lights to guide ships from Cape Fear to Wilmington, North Carolina.

History
In 1849, a two-story, brick lightkeeper's house with a wooden lantern was built as one of the lights. During the American Civil War, this served the Confederacy as a signal house to communicate between Fort Fisher and Fort Caswell. This house was destroyed by storms.

The bricks had been imported from England. The lantern has been removed.

The surviving range light is located at the edge of Archer Daniels Midland's industrial site on the bank of the Cape Fear River. It is currently in private hands, but can be best viewed from the Southport-Fort Fisher ferry or from the ferryboat landing at Southport.
Also was built in the 1850s.

Pictures
 Rare 1939 Postcard Showing Price's Creek Front-Range Light
 Rare 1908 Postcard Showing Price's Creek Rear-Range Light and Keeper's House

References

Lighthouses completed in 1849
Buildings and structures in Brunswick County, North Carolina
Lighthouses in North Carolina
1849 establishments in North Carolina